Kaye Marfani-Hand (born 4 October 1968) is a British former professional tennis player.

Biography
Born in Berkshire, she is the younger sister of sports broadcaster and former player Paul Hand.

Hand reached a highest singles ranking of 201, with her best performance coming at the 1990 Brighton International, where she defeated world number 46 Brenda Schultz in the first round.

At the 1991 Wimbledon Championships, Hand received a wildcard to compete in both the women's singles and doubles draws. In the doubles she and partner Julie Salmon lost in the first round to high profile opponents, Martina Navratilova and Pam Shriver.

References

External links
 
 

1968 births
Living people
English female tennis players
Tennis people from Berkshire
British female tennis players